Wolf Lake is a 1978 film directed by Burt Kennedy and starring Rod Steiger and Robin Mattson.

Plot 
A group of men travel to a duck hunt in the Northwest. One of them, Charlie, is hoping to travel and forget the grief he has over his son's death in Vietnam. When he learns a young member of his party, David, is a deserter, Charlie goes berserk and hunts David.

Cast
Rod Steiger as Charlie
David Huffman as David
Robin Mattson as Linda
Jerry Hardin as Wilbur
Richard Herd as George
Paul Mantee as Sweeney

Production
The film was an early production for Melvin Simon Productions made in 1977. Although set in Canada, the film was made in Chihuahua in Mexico.

Release
The film received a test release on October 16, 1981 under the name The Honor Guard in Colorado Springs, Las Vegas and Pueblo, Colorado with a limited theatrical release in the United States in 1982.

References

External links

1980 films
Films directed by Burt Kennedy
Films about deserters
Films shot in Mexico
Films scored by Ken Thorne
1980s English-language films